SM U-92 was one of 329 submarines serving in the Imperial German Navy in World War I. She was engaged in the commerce warfare in the First Battle of the Atlantic.

Construction of U-92 was ordered in August 1915, and her keel was laid down in August 1916 at the Kaiserliche Werft yard in Danzig.  She was launched in October 1917, and sunk by mine 9 September 1918.

Design
German Type U 87 submarines were preceded by the shorter Type U 81 submarines. U-92 had a displacement of  when at the surface and  while submerged. The submarine was powered by two  engines for use while surfaced, and two  engines for use while submerged. She had two propeller shafts.

U-92 was fitted with four  torpedo tubes (two at the bow and two at the stern), ten to twelve torpedoes, ND one  SK L/45 deck gun. She had a complement of thirty-six (thirty-two crew members and four officers).

Operations 
After acceptance trials at Danzig (where she was first detected by Room 40, which followed and recorded all her subsequent movements), commanded by Kapitänleutnant (Lieutenant) Bieler. She joined the Kiel School 2 November 1917, leaving for the North Sea about the end of December 1917, being attached to the 3rd Flotilla at Wilhelmshaven. All her combat operations took place in 1918.

1st Patrol
U-92 departed for her first war patrol 1 January, via Heligoland Bight and around Scotland into the northern Bay of Biscay, recording no sinkings, and returning to Wilhelmshaven 30 January.

2nd Patrol
Her second patrol began 24 February, and she was assigned to a station southwest of Ireland, transiting the Kiel Canal and the Baltic Sea, due to heavy mining in the North Sea. Again, she scored no victories, but was in the vicinity of The Skaw, at the time the commerce raider Wolf stranded a prize, Igotz Mendi, for two days. She also torpedoed the 7,034-ton steamer , killing one British seaman, and inflicting damage, none severe enough to keep her victim from reaching port. U-92 returned to Kiel on 23 March.

3rd Patrol
After refit, U-92 departed on her third patrol 24 April. She was again assigned to the southwest Ireland station, by way of Heligoland, the Kiel Canal, the Baltic, Denmark, Scotland, and Fair Isle. On this long patrol, from which she returned to Wilhelmshaven on about 28 May (Room 40 was uncertain of the date), she was attacked three times by enemy A/S forces (and once more by patrol seaplane), and again scored no successes. On his return, after his third consecutive dry patrol and in keeping with usual practise for unproductive skippers, Kptlt.. Bieler was relieved.<ref>Koerver, Room 40, Vol 1, Fleet in Action.</ref>

4th PatrolU-92 returned to Ireland station for her fourth patrol, sortieing 29 June, now in the hands of  Kptlt. Günther Ehrlich. She came under attack on only the second day of her patrol, south of Dogger Bank, by two torpedoes from submarine , Both missed. U-92 attacked a convoy eight days later, on 9 July. On 10 July, she fired on the 339 ton armed schooner Charles Theriault with her deck gun, inflicting damage; Theriault was towed to port. Served as USS Westover (ID # 2867) in 1918 and on 13 July, the 3058-ton Spanish steamer  with two torpedoes. By the end of her patrol, on 22 July, she had sunk 22,000 tons of shipping.

5th Patrol
For her fifth patrol, she left via Kattegat on 4 September. She was mined 9 September in Area B of the North Sea Mine Barrage, and lost with all hands; her last position was suspected to be ."

Wreck Site
At the end of 2007, her wreck was located there by the British Maritime and Coastguard Agency ship Anglian Sovereign''.

Summary of raiding history

References

Notes

Citations

Bibliography

External links
A webpage for U-92
U 92 and U 102 wrecks found, 2006 The Maritime and Coastguard Agency  World War I Submarines U 102 and U 92 found by Anglian Sovereign
Diving the U 92, by Steven Slater (www.jeanelaine.co.uk), 15.6.2007
Photos of cruises of German submarine U-54 in 1916-1918.
A 44 min. German film from 1917 about a cruise of the German submarine U-35.

Room 40:  original documents, photos and maps about World War I German submarine warfare and British Room 40 Intelligence from The National Archives, Kew, Richmond, UK.

World War I submarines of Germany
German Type U 87 submarines
Ships built in Danzig
1917 ships
U-boats commissioned in 1917
U-boats sunk in 1918
U-boats sunk by mines
Ships lost with all hands
Maritime incidents in 1918